Between Darkness and Wonder is Lamb's fourth album, released in 2003.

Track listing
All tracks were written by Andrew Barlow and Lou Rhodes (as "Lou Robinson"), except where noted. String arrangements by David Campbell.

Charts

References

2003 albums
Lamb (band) albums
Mercury Records albums